= Motorpoint Arena =

Motorpoint Arena may refer to:

- Cardiff International Arena, formerly known as Motorpoint Arena Cardiff
- Motorpoint Arena Nottingham
- Sheffield Arena, formerly known as Motorpoint Arena Sheffield
